Rubén Leonardo Pico Carvajal (born 4 September 1991) is a Colombian professional footballer who plays as a defensive midfielder for Independiente Santa Fe.

Honours

Club
Patriotas
Primera B (1): 2011
Santa Fe
Primera A (1): 2016–II
Suruga Bank Championship (1): 2016
Junior
Primera A (1): 2018–II
Copa Colombia (1): 2017

Records
Patriotas Record Appearance Maker: 162 games

References

External links 
 

1991 births
Living people
Colombian footballers
Independiente Santa Fe footballers
Atlético Junior footballers
Association football midfielders
Sportspeople from Boyacá Department
21st-century Colombian people